Oh What a Paradise It Seems is a 1982 novella by John Cheever. It is Cheever's last work of fiction, published shortly before his death from cancer.

The main character is Lemuel Sears, an elderly computer-industry executive, twice-widowed, who pursues an ardent but unsuccessful love affair with Renee, a beautiful but elusive woman who works in real-estate. There are numerous subplots. Sears becomes involved in another love affair, and is also funding an investigation of the pollution of Beasley's Pond in Connecticut, where he enjoys ice skating. The novella reprises many of Cheever's familiar themes, including love, lust, life in suburbia, and a sense of displacement.

Writing in the New York Times, John Leonard called the novella "perfect Cheever; it is perfect, period."  John Updike, a friend of Cheever, preferred it to Cheever's novel Falconer, and remarked on the theme of ice skating, which he called his "Wordsworthian hike" and his "connection with elemental purity and the awesome depths above and below".

References

1982 American novels
American novellas
Novels by John Cheever
Alfred A. Knopf books